Fan language may refer to:
 An alternative spelling of the Fang language
 A dialect of the Berom language